Tell Me a Secret is the fifth studio album by Australian jazz musician Vince Jones, released in November 1986.

At the ARIA Music Awards of 1987, the album was nominated for ARIA Award for Best Jazz Album and ARIA Award for Best Adult Contemporary Album.

Track listing
 "Don't Worry About a Thing" - 3:12
 "Two Sleepy People" - 2:56
 "Sensual Item" - 4:19
 "I've Been Used" - 2:39
 "Too Much Too Soon" - 3:01
 "Tell Me a Secret" - 3:59
 "Stop This World" - 3:45
 "It's Hard to Be Good" - 4:10
 "Harold's Land" - 4:34
 "I've Never Been in Love Before" - 3:20
 "Some Say You Win" - 3:29
 "All the Way" - 5:02

Charts

References

1986 albums
Vince Jones albums
Jazz albums by Australian artists